Long Live Heavy Metal is the fifth and final studio album from the Canadian heavy metal band 3 Inches of Blood. It is the second 3 Inches of Blood album to be released through Century Media and not feature Jamie Hooper on screaming vocals, and is their only release to feature the same line-up as the previous one.

Track listing

Personnel

3 Inches Of Blood
 Cam Pipes – clean vocals
 Justin Hagberg – harsh vocals, rhythm guitar, bass
 Shane Clark – lead guitar, bass
 Ash Pearson - drums

Additional personnel
 Alia O'Brien - flute on #04
 Terry "Sho" Murray - producer
 Kim Thiessen - artworks

Notes
Although Byron Stroud appears on the credits as the bassist member of the band, all bass on the album was performed by Justin Hagberg & Shane Clark. Both were credited using a ficticional character, 'Shustin Hagblark', a mix of both names.

References

2012 albums
3 Inches of Blood albums
Century Media Records albums